Petworth railway station was a railway station nearly two miles (3 km) from the town of Petworth in West Sussex, England.

It was located on the former London, Brighton and South Coast Railway single track Pulborough to Midhurst branch line. It had a single platform, and a passing loop for freight trains, together with a signal box and goods facilities.

The line was opened to here on 10 October 1859 and extended westwards to Midhurst in 1866. The main station building was rebuilt in about 1892 and is a wooden 1-storey structure with architectural embellishments.

The station was closed to passengers by the Southern Region of British Railways on 5 February 1955 and to freight traffic on 20 May 1966. Some time after this, the station building was converted to a guest house and a number of former Pullman lounge cars converted to camping coaches have been relocated here from Marazion in Cornwall as sleeping accommodation.

References

External links 

The Old Railway Station, Petworth

Disused railway stations in West Sussex
Railway stations in Great Britain opened in 1859
Railway stations in Great Britain closed in 1966
Bed and breakfasts
Former London, Brighton and South Coast Railway stations
Petworth